Profit In Your Poetry is the debut studio album by Butcher Boy. It was released on 5 March 2007 on HDIF Records.

Track listing

"Trouble And Desire" (2:34)
"There Is No-One Who Can Tell You Where You've Been" (2:30)
"Profit In Your Poetry" (3:09)
"I Could Be In Love With Anyone" (3:00)
"I Lost Myself" (3:19)
"Girls Make Me Sick" (3:22)
"I Know Who You Could Be" (2:40)
"Fun" (4:21)
"Keep Your Powder Dry" (2:16)
"Day Like These Will Be The Death Of Me" (3:24)

2007 albums